Duke of Sutherland is a title in the Peerage of the United Kingdom which was created by William IV in 1833 for George Leveson-Gower, 2nd Marquess of Stafford. A series of marriages to heiresses by members of the Leveson-Gower family made the Dukes of Sutherland one of the richest landowning families in the United Kingdom. The title remained in the Leveson-Gower family until the death of the 5th Duke of Sutherland in 1963, when it passed to the 5th Earl of Ellesmere from the Egerton family.

The subsidiary titles of the Duke of Sutherland are: Marquess of Stafford (created 1786), Earl Gower (1746), Earl of Ellesmere, of Ellesmere in the County of Shropshire (1846), Viscount Trentham, of Trentham in the County of Stafford (1746), Viscount Brackley, of Brackley in the County of Northampton (1846), and Baron Gower, of Sittenham in the County of York (1703). The marquessate of Stafford, the earldom of Gower and the viscountcy of Trentham are in the Peerage of Great Britain, the dukedom, the earldom of Ellesmere and the viscountcy of Brackley in the Peerage of the United Kingdom, and the barony of Gower in the Peerage of England. The Duke is also a Baronet, of Sittenham in the County of York, a title created in the Baronetage of England in 1620. Between 1839 and 1963 the Dukes also held the titles of Lord Strathnaver and Earl of Sutherland, both in the Peerage of Scotland. The Scottish titles came into the family through the marriage of the first Duke to Elizabeth Sutherland, 19th Countess of Sutherland.

Family history
Sir Thomas Gower was created a baronet, of Sittenham in the County of York, by James I of England in 1620. This title was in the Baronetage of England. His son Thomas, the second Baronet, married Frances, daughter of Sir John Leveson. Their grandson William, the fourth Baronet (who succeeded his unmarried elder brother), assumed the additional surname of Leveson. Sir William married Lady Jane (d. 1696), daughter of John Granville, 1st Earl of Bath and sister of Grace Carteret, 1st Countess Granville (see Earl Granville). Their son John, the fifth Baronet, was raised to the Peerage of England as Baron Gower, of Sittenham in the County of York, in 1706. His son, the second Baron, served three times as Lord Privy Seal. In 1746 he was created Viscount Trentham, of Trentham in the County of Stafford, and Earl Gower. Both titles are in the Peerage of Great Britain. His eldest surviving son from his first marriage, Granville, the second Earl, was also a prominent politician. In 1786 he was created Marquess of Stafford in the Peerage of Great Britain. Lord Stafford married secondly Lady Louisa Egerton, daughter of Scroop Egerton, 1st Duke of Bridgewater. His son from his third marriage to Lady Susanna Stewart, Lord Granville Leveson-Gore, was created Earl Granville in 1833, a revival of the title created for his great-great-aunt in 1715.
Lord Stafford was succeeded by his eldest son from his second marriage, George. He married Elizabeth Sutherland, 19th Countess of Sutherland.  In 1803 he succeeded to the vast estates of his maternal uncle Francis Egerton, 3rd Duke of Bridgewater.  In 1833 he was created Duke of Sutherland in the Peerage of the United Kingdom for his support for the Reform Act 1832.

Clearances

The 1st Duke and Duchess of Sutherland remain controversial for their role in the Highland Clearances, when thousands of tenants were evicted and resettled in coastal villages. This allowed the vacated land to be used for extensive sheep farming, replacing the mixed farming carried out by the previous occupants. This was part of the Scottish Agricultural Revolution. The changes on the Sutherland estate were motivated by two major objectives. The first was to increase the rental income from the estate: sheep farmers could afford much higher rents. The second was to remove the population from the recurrent risks of famine. Historical opinion differs on the relevance and severity of famine years, but most do not dispute that the Highland region remained the only part of mainland Britain that was affected in this way at this time.

The future 1st Duke became the proprietor of the Sutherland Estate (which comprised much of the county of Sutherland) on his marriage to Lady Elizabeth Sutherland, the Countess of Sutherland, in 1785. Despite the conventions of the day, Lady Sutherland retained control of the management of the estate, rather than passing this responsibility to her husband.

The Sutherland Clearances did not start until the 19th century, mainly due to insufficient capital – a problem that was solved when, in 1803, George Leveson-Gower, the future 1st Duke inherited a huge fortune from the Duke of Bridgewater. The remaining delay was that many leases did not expire until 1807 or later, but plans were put together for the interior of the estate to be devoted to large sheep farms, with new settlements to be built for the displaced inhabitants. A tentative start was made to this with the letting of the first big sheep farm at Lairg in 1807, involving the removal of about 300 people. Many of these did not accept their new homes and emigrated, to the dissatisfaction of the estate management and Lady Sutherland.

Lady Sutherland was not happy with the estate factor and, in 1811, replaced him with William Young and Patrick Sellar. Young had a proven track record of agricultural improvement in Moray and Sellar was a lawyer educated at the University of Edinburgh; both were fully versed in the modern ideas of Adam Smith. They provided an extra level of ambition for the estate.  New industries were added to the plans, to employ the resettled population. A coal mine was sunk at Brora, and fishing villages were built to exploit the herring shoals off the coast. Other ideas were tanning, flax, salt and brick manufacturing. 

The next clearances were in Assynt in 1812, under the direction of Sellar, establishing large sheep farms and resettling the old tenants on the coast. Sellar had the assistance of the local tacksmen in this and the process was conducted without unrest – despite the unpopularity of events. But in 1813, planned clearances in the Strath of Kildonan were accompanied by riots: an angry mob drove prospective sheep farmers out of the valley when they came to view the land, and a situation of confrontation existed for more than six weeks, with Sellar failing to successfully negotiate with the protesters. Ultimately, the army was called out and the estate made concessions such as paying very favourable prices for the cattle of those being cleared. This was assisted by landlords in surrounding districts taking in some of those displaced and an organised party emigrating to Canada. The whole process was a severe shock to Lady Sutherland and her advisers, who were, in the words of historian Eric Richards, "genuinely astonished at this response to plans which they regarded as wise and benevolent".

Further clearances were scheduled in Strathnaver starting at Whitsun, 1814. These were complicated by Sellar having successfully bid for the lease of one of the new sheep farms on land that it was now his responsibility, as factor, to clear. (Overall, this clearance was part of the removal of 430 families from Strathnaver and Brora in 1814 – an estimated 2,000 people.) Sellar had also made an enemy of the local law officer, Robert Mackid, by catching him poaching on the Sutherland's land. There was some confusion among the tenants as Sellar made concessions to some of them, allowing them to stay in their properties a little longer. Some tenants moved in advance of the date in their eviction notice – others stayed until the eviction parties arrived. As was normal practice, the roof timbers of cleared houses were destroyed to prevent re-occupation after the eviction party had left. On 13 June 1814, this was done by burning in the case of Badinloskin, the house occupied by William Chisholm. Accounts vary, but it is possible that his elderly and bedridden mother-in-law was still in the house when it was set on fire. In James Hunter's understanding of events, Sellar ordered her to be immediately carried out as soon as he realised what was happening. The old lady died six days later. Eric Richards suggests that the old woman was carried to an outbuilding before the house was destroyed. Whatever the facts of the matter, Sellar was charged with culpable homicide and arson, in respect of this incident and others during this clearance. The charges were brought by Robert Mackid. As the trial approached, the Sutherland estate was reluctant to assist Sellar in his defence, distancing themselves from their employee. He was acquitted of all charges at his trial in 1816. The estate were hugely relieved, taking this as a justification of their clearance activity. (Robert Mackid became a ruined man and had to leave the county, providing Sellar with a grovelling letter of apology and confession.)

Despite the acquittal, this event, and Sellar's role in it, was fixed in the popular view of the Sutherland Clearances. James Loch, the Stafford estate commissioner was now taking a greater interest in the Northern part of his employer's holdings; he thought Young's financial management was incompetent, and Sellar's actions among the people deeply concerning. Both Sellar and William Young soon left their management posts with the Sutherland estate (though Sellar remained as a major tenant). Loch, nevertheless, also subscribed to the theory that clearance was beneficial for the tenants as much as for the estate.

Lady Sutherland's displeasure with events was added to by critical reports in a minor London newspaper, the Military Register, from April 1815. These were soon carried in larger newspapers. They originated from Alexander Sutherland, who, with his brother John Sutherland of Sciberscross, were opponents of clearance. Alexander, after serving as a captain in the army had been thwarted in his hopes to take up leases on the Sutherland estate and now worked as a journalist in London. He was therefore well placed to cause trouble for the estate.

The (effective) dismissal of Sellar placed him in the role of scapegoat, thereby preventing a proper critical analysis of the estate's policies. Clearances continued under the factorship of Frances Suther and the overall control of James Loch. Through 1816 and 1817, famine conditions affected most of the inland areas and the estate had to provide relief to those who were destitute. This altered policy on emigration: if tenants wanted to emigrate, the estate would not object, but there was still no active encouragement.

In 1818 a large (perhaps the largest) clearance program was put into effect, lasting until 1820. Loch gave emphatic instructions intended to avoid another public relations disaster: rent arrears could be excused for those who co-operated, time was to be taken and rents for the new crofts were to be set as low as possible.

The process did not start well. The Reverend David Mackenzie of Kildonan wrote to Loch on behalf of the 220 families due to be cleared from his parish. He challenged the basic premise of the clearance: that the people from an inland region could make a living on their new coastal crofts. Loch was adamant that the removals would go ahead regardless of objections. Yet, at the same time, Suther and the local ground officer of the estate were pointing out to Loch that few of the new crofts were of an acceptable quality. Some tenants were considering moving off the estate, either to Caithness or emigrating to America or the Cape of Good Hope, which Suther encouraged by writing off their rent arrears. More positively, cattle prices were high in 1818. Ultimately, that year's clearances passed without serious protest.

The next two years had much bigger clearances: 425 families (about 2,000 people) in 1819 and 522 families in 1820. Loch was anxious to move quickly, whilst cattle prices were high and there was a good demand for leases of sheep farms. There was no resistance in 1819, but Suther, despite precise instructions to the contrary, used fire to destroy cleared houses.

Estates
According to the will of the Duke of Bridgewater, the Egerton estates passed on the death of the first Duke of Sutherland to his third but second-surviving son Lord Francis Leveson-Gower, who changed his surname to Egerton by Royal licence. In 1846 he was created Viscount Brackley and Earl of Ellesmere.

The Duke was succeeded by his eldest son and namesake George, the second Duke. In 1839 he also succeeded his mother in the ancient Scottish titles of Earl of Sutherland and Lord Strathnaver. His eldest son, the third Duke, married Anne Hay-Mackenzie, who in 1864 was created Countess of Cromarty, with remainder to their younger sons (see Earl of Cromarty).

His grandson, the fifth Duke, succeeded to the title at the age of 25 in 1913. In 1914 he decided on the outbreak of the First World War that it was unwise to have so much of his riches tied up in land and property. He then decided he wanted to live closer to London, and sold the whole package in 1917 to Sir John Lee. The Duke was childless; on his death in 1963, the line of the eldest son of the first Duke failed. He was succeeded in the earldom of Sutherland and lordship of Strathnaver, which could be inherited by females, by his niece Elizabeth. Elizabeth also inherited most of her uncle's wealth, but the dukedom and other titles could only be passed on to male heirs, and they were inherited by his third cousin once removed, John Sutherland Egerton, 5th Earl of Ellesmere, who became the 6th Duke of Sutherland as well. He was a great-great-grandson of the first Earl of Ellesmere, third son of the first Duke of Sutherland. He also died childless and was succeeded by his first cousin once removed, Francis Ronald Egerton, the seventh and present duke, a grandson of the Hon. Francis William George Egerton, second son of the third Earl of Ellesmere.

Today most of the duke's wealth is in the form of the art collection put together by the first duke's uncle, Francis Egerton, 3rd Duke of Bridgewater, which had been inherited by the Ellesmere line of the family.  In 2003 the new Duke sold Titian's Venus Anadyomene to the National Gallery of Scotland. In 2009 he sold the two other masterpieces by Titian: Diana and Callisto and Diana and Actaeon, but he is still the owner of other masterpieces, such as a 1657 self-portrait by Rembrandt, the Bridgewater Madonna by Raphael and the Sacraments series by French master Nicolas Poussin.

Other family members
William Gower, youngest son of Sir William the fourth Baronet, was Member of Parliament for Ludlow.

The Hon. William Leveson-Gower, second son of John, first Baron Gower and grandson of the fourth Baronet, was Member of Parliament for Stafford. The Hon. Thomas Leveson-Gower, third son of the first Baron, was Member of Parliament for Newcastle-under-Lyme. The Hon. Baptist Leveson-Gower, fourth son of the first Baron, was also Member of Parliament for Newcastle-under-Lyme.

The Hon. Richard Leveson-Gower, fourth son of the first Earl, was Member of Parliament for Lichfield. The Hon. John Leveson-Gower (1740–1792), sixth son of the first Earl, was an Admiral in the Royal Navy.

Frederick Neville Sutherland Leveson-Gower, son of Lord Albert Leveson-Gower, younger son of the second Duke, sat as Member of Parliament for Sutherland. Lord Ronald Gower, youngest son of the second Duke, was a politician, sculptor and writer.

Sir Henry 'Shrimp' Leveson-Gower H. D. G. Leveson Gower, Leveson Gower was born in Titsey Place near Oxted in Surrey, the seventh of twelve sons of Granville William Gresham Leveson-Gower JP DL FSA, by his wife The Hon Sophia Leveson Gower LJStJ (née Leigh). Captain of England Cricket v South Africa in 1909–10, captained England in all three of the Test matches in South Africa. Leveson Gower became an England Test selector in 1909, and was chairman of selectors in 1924 and from 1927 to 1930.

H. D. G. Leveson Gower

Seats
The family seat was originally Lilleshall Hall and later, grander, family seats included Trentham Hall, Dunrobin Castle, and Cliveden. The traditional burial place of the Dukes of Sutherland from the Leveson-Gower family was Trentham Mausoleum, a grade I listed mausoleum in Trentham, Stoke-on-Trent.

In the 19th and early 20th century the family's London residence was Stafford House, which was rated as the most valuable private residence in London.

The duke's current seat is at Mertoun House in St. Boswells, in the Scottish Borders.

Coat of arms
When members of the Leveson-Gower family held the dukedom of Sutherland, the arms were: Quarterly, Gules a Cross Flory Sable (Gower), Azure three Laurel Leaves Or (Leveson); Gules three Mullets Or on a Bordure of the second a Double Tressure flory counterflory of the first (Sutherland); Crest: A Wolf passant Argent collared and lined Or; Supporters: a Wolf Argent plain collared and Line reflexed over the back Or.

Since the passing of the dukedom of Sutherland to the Egerton family in 1963, the 6th Duke and his successors have used the Egerton family coat of arms: Argent a Lion rampant Gules between three Pheons Sable.

Gower, later Leveson-Gower Baronets, of Stittenham (1620)
Sir Thomas Gower, 1st Baronet (1584–c. 1665) was descended in the direct male line from a number of knights
Sir Thomas Gower, 2nd Baronet (c. 1605–1672), son of the 1st Baronet
Edward Gower, an elder son of the 2nd Baronet, presumably predeceased his father
Sir Thomas Gower, 3rd Baronet (c. 1666–1689), a son of Edward, died unmarried
Sir William Leveson-Gower, 4th Baronet (c. 1647–1691), a younger son of the 2nd Baronet
Sir John Leveson-Gower, 5th Baronet (1675–1709) (created Baron Gower in 1703)

Barons Gower (1703)
John Leveson-Gower, 1st Baron Gower (1675–1709), eldest son of the 4th Baronet
John Leveson-Gower, 2nd Baron Gower (1694–1754) (created Earl Gower in 1746)

Earls Gower (1746)
Other titles: Viscount Trentham, of Trentham in the county of Stafford (1746) and Baron Gower (1703)
John Leveson-Gower, 1st Earl Gower (1694–1754), eldest son of the 1st Baron
Granville Leveson-Gower, 2nd Earl Gower (1721–1803) (created Marquess of Stafford in 1786)

Marquesses of Stafford (1786)
Other titles: Earl Gower and Viscount Trentham, of Trentham in the county of Stafford (1746) and Baron Gower (1703)
Granville Leveson-Gower, 1st Marquess of Stafford (1721–1803), third (eldest surviving) son of the 1st Earl
George Leveson-Gower, 2nd Marquess of Stafford (1758–1833) (created Duke of Sutherland in 1833)

Dukes of Sutherland (1833)
Other titles (1st Duke onwards): Marquess of Stafford (1786), Earl Gower and Viscount Trentham, of Trentham in the county of Stafford (1746) and Baron Gower (1703)
George Granville Leveson-Gower, 1st Duke of Sutherland (1758–1833), eldest son of the 1st Marquess
Other titles (2nd–5th Dukes): Earl of Sutherland and Lord Strathnaver (Sc 1235)
George Granville Sutherland-Leveson-Gower, 2nd Duke of Sutherland (1786–1861), eldest son of the 1st Duke
George Granville Sutherland-Leveson-Gower, 3rd Duke of Sutherland (1828–1892), eldest son of the 2nd Duke
George Granville Sutherland-Leveson-Gower, Earl Gower (1850–1858), eldest son of the 3rd Duke (then Lord Stafford), died in childhood
Cromartie Sutherland-Leveson-Gower, 4th Duke of Sutherland (1851–1913), second son of the 3rd Duke
George Granville Sutherland-Leveson-Gower, 5th Duke of Sutherland (1888–1963), eldest son of the 4th Duke, died without issue
Other titles (6th Duke onwards): Earl of Ellesmere and Viscount Brackley, of Brackley in the county of Northamptonshire (1846)
John Sutherland Egerton, 6th Duke of Sutherland (1915–2000), already 5th Earl of Ellesmere, great-great-grandson of Francis Egerton, 1st Earl of Ellesmere (previously Lord Francis Leveson-Gower), third son of the 1st Duke, died without issue
Francis Ronald Egerton, 7th Duke of Sutherland (b. 1940), first cousin once removed of the 6th Duke and great-grandson of Francis Charles Granville Egerton, 3rd Earl of Ellesmere
Heir apparent: James Granville Egerton, Marquess of Stafford (b. 1975), eldest son of the 7th Duke. He has four daughters.

The second in line is Lord Henry Alexander Egerton (b. 1977), younger son of the 7th Duke, who has three daughters. (reference:- Debretts Peerage 2019 Edition)

Line of succession

  John Leveson-Gower, 1st Earl Gower (1694–1754)
 Granville Leveson-Gower, 1st Marquess of Stafford (1721–1803)
 George Leveson-Gower, 1st Duke of Sutherland (1758–1833)
 Francis Egerton, 1st Earl of Ellesmere (1800–1857)
 George Egerton, 2nd Earl of Ellesmere (1823–1862)
 Francis Egerton, 3rd Earl of Ellesmere (1847–1914)
Hon. Thomas Henry Frederick Egerton (1876–1953)
Reginald Cyril Egerton (1905–1992)
 Francis Ronald Egerton, 7th Duke of Sutherland, 8th Marquess of Stafford, 6th Earl of Ellesmere (born 1940)
(1). James Granville Egerton, Marquess of Stafford (born 1975)
(2). Lord Henry Alexander Egerton (born 1977)
Admiral Hon. Francis Egerton (1824–1895)William Francis Egerton (1868–1949)Francis Egerton (1896–1935)Anthony Francis Egerton (1921–1985)(3). Simon Francis Cavendish Egerton (born 1949)Michael Godolphin Egerton (1924–1979)(4). Nicholas Egerton (born 1967)David William Egerton (1930–2012)(5). Frank Egerton (born 1959)
 Granville Leveson-Gower, 1st Earl Granville (1773–1846) Granville Leveson-Gower, 2nd Earl Granville (1815–1891) William Leveson-Gower, 4th Earl Granville (1880–1953) Granville Leveson-Gower, 5th Earl Granville (1918–1996) Granville Leveson-Gower, 6th Earl Granville (born 1959) (6)
George James Leveson-Gower, Lord Leveson (born 1999) (7) 
Hon. Niall James Leveson-Gower (born 1963) (8)
Charlie Leveson-Gower (born 2000) (9) Rear-Admiral Hon. John Leveson-Gower (1740–1792)
General John Leveson-Gower (1774–1816)
John Leveson-Gower (1802–1883)
Hugh Broke Boscawen Leveson-Gower (1836–1890)
Charles Cameron Leveson-Gower (1866–1951)
Harold Boscawen Leveson-Gower (1905–1973)
Charles Murrough Leveson-Gower (1933–1983)
Mark Broke Leveson-Gower (born 1961) (10)
Hugh Charles Leveson-Gower (born 1993) (11)
Henry Boscawen Boddington Leveson-Gower (born 1962) (12)
Reuben Boddington Leveson-Gower (born 1993) (13)
William Leveson-Gower (1779–1851)
William Leveson-Gower (1806–1860)
Granville William Gresham Leveson-Gower (1838–1895)
Evelyn Marmaduke Gresham Leveson-Gower (1872–1938)
Alastair Marmaduke Gresham Leveson-Gower (1907–1990)
Robert Alastair Leveson-Gower (born 1946) (14)
Rupert Evelyn Gresham Leveson-Gower (1911–1985)
Charles William Gresham Leveson-Gower (born 1959) (15)

Individuals numbered 1 to 5 are in the line of succession to the dukedom and its subsidiary titles. If the dukedom were to become extinct, the marquessate of Stafford would pass to the Earl Granville, heir of the younger son of the first Marquess. Individuals in the line of succession to the marquessate and the earldoms of Granville and Gower are numbered from 6 (the present Earl Granville) to 8.

Family Tree

See also
Earl of Sutherland
Duke of Bridgewater
Earl Granville
Earl of Bath (1661 creation)
Earl of Cromartie
Earl of Ellesmere
Highland Clearances
Sutherland

Notes

References

External links
Duke of Sutherland

Dukedoms in the Peerage of the United Kingdom
Highland Clearances
1703 establishments in England
1620 establishments in England
1746 establishments in Great Britain
1833 establishments in the United Kingdom
Noble titles created in 1833

Sutherland
 
British landowners